The NORCECA Women's Volleyball Championship is the official competition for senior women's national volleyball teams of North America, Central America and the Caribbean, organized by the North, Central America and Caribbean Volleyball Confederation (NORCECA). Since its introduction in 1969 the tournaments have been awarded every two years. The competition has been dominated by Cuba and United States, which won together 21 of the 26 editions of the tournament.

History

Medals summary

MVP by edition

1969 – 1999 – Unknown
2001 –  Tara Cross-Battle
2003 –  Yumilka Ruíz
2005 –  Nancy Metcalf
2007 –  Nancy Carrillo
2009 –  Prisilla Rivera
2011 –  Bethania de la Cruz
2013 –  Kelly Murphy
2015 –  Nicole Fawcett
2019 –  Brayelin Martínez
2021 –  Gaila González

All-time team records

(Based on W=2 pts and D=1 pts)

See also

 NORCECA Men's Volleyball Championship
 Women's Junior NORCECA Volleyball Championship
 Girls' Youth NORCECA Volleyball Championship
 Volleyball at the Pan American Games
 Women's Pan-American Volleyball Cup
 Volleyball at the Central American and Caribbean Games

Notes

References

External links
 NORCECA

 
 
V
Volleyball competitions in North America
Volleyball in Central America
Volleyball in the Caribbean
International volleyball competitions
International women's volleyball competitions
North American international sports competitions
Biennial sporting events